JScheme is an implementation of the Scheme programming language, created by Kenneth R. Anderson, Timothy J. Hickey and Peter Norvig, which is almost compliant with the R4RS Scheme standard and which has an interface to Java.

Distributed under the licence of zlib/libpng, JScheme is free software.

See also

List of JVM languages

External links

Free compilers and interpreters
Scheme (programming language) implementations
Scheme (programming language) interpreters
JVM programming languages
Java programming language family
Software using the zlib license